The Lego Movie: 4D – A New Adventure is a 4-D film attraction based on The Lego Movie, which premiered at Legoland Florida on 29 January 2016 and was rolled out to other Legoland parks and Legoland Discovery Centres. The story features some of the original characters from The Lego Movie who are invited to a theme park called Brick World. The story is enhanced with a variety of 4D sensory effects.

Plot
Following the events of The Lego Movie, Emmet, Wyldstyle, Unikitty, Benny and MetalBeard reunite to go to Legoland. However, they instead receive an invitation to go to a knock-off called Brick World. They then meet Risky Business, Lord Business' older brother, who tries to hypnotise them to perform in a Lego Movie live show. MetalBeard, Unikitty and Benny quickly go to their attractions, while Emmet goes with Wyldstyle to his. Emmet is unhappy, so Wyldstyle takes him to her attraction to cheer him up.

Because of the extent, the group end up enjoying Brick World; Business takes advantage and sends his robots to hypnotise them with VIP wristbands. Emmet and Wyldstyle evade being hypnotised and discover Business' evil plans, as well as the audience. With the help of the audience, Emmet and Wyldstyle build a lemonade stand mech and save their friends. Business tries to escape, but a policeman stops Risky from doing so, and arrests him for making Brick World without permission. Emmet and Wyldstyle thank the audience before finally heading to Legoland with their friends.

Cast

 A. J. Locascio as Emmet Brickowski
 Elizabeth Banks as Lucy "Wyldstyle"
 Alison Brie as Princess Unikitty
 Charlie Day as Benny
 Nick Offerman as MetalBeard
 Patton Oswalt as Risky Business
 David Burrows as Risky Business' Robots
 Rob Schrab as Man of the Audience/Planty
 Adam Pava as Police Man

4D effects 
Viewers are provided with 3D glasses to experience the visual effects. The film is designed to be an immersive experience and incorporates 4D sensory effects during its 12-minute run time. These include sound, wind, fog and lighting effects.

Production 
The Lego Movie: 4D – A New Adventure was produced by Pure Imagination Studios and The Lego Group. The story was written by Adam Pava and Rob Schrab and the film was directed by Rob Schrab.

Distribution
The Lego Movie: 4D – A New Adventure  was launched on 29 January 2016 at Legoland Florida and rolled out to other Legoland parks and Legoland Discovery Centres. It is currently located in all Legoland parks and Legoland Discovery Centres along with a location in Warner Bros. Movie World. It is available at scheduled times alongside other short films, including Lego City 4D - Officer in Pursuit and Lego Ninjago: Master of the 4th Dimension.

See also 

 Lego Ninjago: Master of the 4th Dimension
Lego City 4D - Officer in Pursuit
 List of Lego films and TV series

References

4D - A New Adventure
Legoland
Amusement rides introduced in 2016
Amusement park films
3D short films
4D films
2010s American animated films
Amusement rides based on film franchises
Films about toys